Jason D. Padgett is an American artist with alleged acquired savant syndrome. Jason was born in 1970 in the city of Anchorage, Alaska. As a young man, Jason dropped out of Tacoma community college and worked as a salesman for his father's futon company. His life changed on the night of September 13, 2002 when he was attacked and robbed by two men outside a local karaoke bar. This attack allegedly caused a change in his brain activitysource?.

Life before the attack 
Padgett was born and raised in Alaska. When he was 9 years old, his parents divorced and Jason moved with his mom and brother to the small town of Cantwell, Alaska.  As a young man, he bungee jumped at least 30 times, skydived nineteen times, scuba dived with sharks and had a brown belt in karate.  He soon dropped out of community college to sell futons full time.

The attack 
On Friday the 13th in September of 2002, Padgett went out to a local karaoke bar with his friends in Tacoma, Washington. As he was leaving the bar, he was hit on the back of the head. He saw a white light like a photo camera flash, felt dizzy like the whole world was spinning around him, fell down and lost consciousness. As he came back to consciousness he didn't know where he was or how he got there. As he tried to stand up he was punched and kicked by two men repeatedly. His friend stood there looking on but did not intervene. The attackers robbed him of his leather jacket, but left his wallet containing a couple of hundred dollars untouched.

Once at the Tacoma General Hospital, doctors diagnosed him with a badly bruised kidney and a severe concussion. He received medication and was sent home that night. His attackers, Brady Simmons and Andrew Schrinek, were eventually arrested but released.

Life after the attack 
The day after the attack, Padgett felt very strange. He assumed it was an effect of the medication he was prescribed but as time went on, it was clear the attack had changed him in more profound and long-term ways than anyone had imagined. As a result of his traumatic brain injury, Padgett began displaying signs of Obsessive Compulsive Disorder and Post Traumatic Stress Disorder. He also began viewing the world through a lens of mathematical shapes, something he had never seen before.

OCD and PTSD 
The onset of OCD and PTSD happened immediately. He found himself obsessed with not touching germs. He would wash his hands 20 times in 30 minutes trying to avoid touching something in the process that may have been dirty. He avoided people by only leaving his home at night for food and hammering three layers of blankets over his windows to avoid sunlight. He would sleep for days only to wake up and try to fall back asleep. He had changed from social butterfly to antisocial in a matter of days. This behavior change lasted for three years.

Seeing shapes and acquired savant syndrome 
Immediately after the attack, Padgett also began seeing the world in shapes. Water now looked like tangent lines and light became rays made up of lines and spirals. Many of the images he began to see corresponded to geometry and physics concepts he had never studied.  Somehow he knew it was all related to Pi. He began drawing the shapes he would see. Drawing became therapeutic and helped managing his OCD and PTSD. He contacted Wisconsin psychiatrist Dr. Darold Treffert, a world-recognized expert on savantism who eventually diagnosed Padgett with acquired savant syndrome. According to the New York Post, "Padgett is one of only 40 people in the world with “acquired savant syndrome,” a condition in which prodigious talents in math, art or music emerge in previously normal individuals following a brain injury or disease."

Padgett was later invited to partake in a study at the University of Miami with Berit Brogaard, where she used fMRI machines and transcranial magnetic stimulations to understand how Jason's brain had been affected by the attack. Jason learned that the left side of his brain, the side that houses math abilities, had greater activation than his right.

Padgett continued drawing the shapes he saw. He would take his drawing pad everywhere he went and one day a man approached him asking about his drawings.“I’m trying to describe the discrete structure of space time based on Planck length (a tiny unit of measurement developed by physicist Max Planck) and quantum black holes,” Padgett told him. It turned out the man was a physicist and recognized the high-level mathematics Padgett was drawing. He urged him to take a math class, which led Padgett to enroll in a community college, where he began to learn the language he needed to describe his obsession." 
Padgett returned to school where he eventually learned the mathematical vocabulary to communicate what he was seeing and experiencing. While attending school, he met his now wife, Elena Padgett.

Fame 
Padgett now views the attack and its effects as a gift. Since the attack, he has gone on to make and sell his artwork on his personal website portraying the shapes he sees, has written a book about the attack and life thereafter, and has given TEDx talks. Studio Sony picked up the rights to make a movie about his life.

Fifteen years after the attack, one of Padgett's attackers, Brady Simmons, reached out. Brady had changed his life around, found sobriety, and apologized to Jason for his action that day. Both men found their meeting to be cathartic and healing.

Padgett believes his attacks and his abilities to see geometric shapes will play an important role in science and math. He's hopeful more students will enter the field of math and science as they hear his story and realize the many ways math and science apply to our lives.

In 2021, he and his family moved to Carmel, Indiana after he wrote a program to determine a place to live.

References

External links
TED talk

People from Anchorage, Alaska
Acquired savants
1970 births
Living people